NGC 439 is a lenticular galaxy of type SAB0^-(rs)? located in the constellation Sculptor. It was discovered on September 27, 1834 by John Herschel. It was described by Dreyer as "pretty bright, small, round, gradually brighter middle."

References

0439
18340927
Sculptor (constellation)
Lenticular galaxies
004423